Kristjan Sarv (born Tartu, 21 December 1979) is an Estonian actor.

He studied acting at the Estonian Academy of Music and Theatre (2000-2004). From 2005–2008, he worked in the theatre NO99. He has appeared in several television series and feature films in Estonia and abroad.

Selected filmography
 Nimed marmortahvlil (feature film, 2002)
 Kelgukoerad (TV series, 2007)
 Soovide puu (feature film, 2008)
 Tuulepealne maa (TV miniseries, 2008)
 Punane elavhõbe (feature film, 2010)
 Arne Dahl: Misterioso (TV miniseries, 2011)
 Vuosaari (feature film, 2012)
 Puhdistus (feature film, 2012)
 1944 (feature film, 2015)
 The Bridge (TV miniseries, 2018)
 Mihkel (feature film, 2018)
 Kättemaksukontor (TV series, 2009–2019)
 Apteeker Melchior (feature film, 2022)
 Erik Kivisüda (feature film, 2022)
 Kalev (feature film, 2022)

References

External links

1979 births
Estonian male film actors
Living people
Male actors from Tartu
Estonian male television actors
Estonian male stage actors
21st-century Estonian male actors
Estonian Academy of Music and Theatre alumni